Prem Kumar is an Indian actor known for his roles in Malayalam films. He has acted more than 100 films, and played lead roles in 18 films. In 2022 he was appointed as vice-chairman of Kerala State Chalachitra Academy.

Personal life and education

Prem Kumar was born to James Samuel and Jayakumari in Kazhakoottam, Thiruvananthapuram, Kerala. Ajith Kumar and Prasanna Kumar are his siblings. He received his primary education from Kazhakoottam Govt U.P School, Muslim Boys High School, Kaniyapuram and St. Xavier's College, Thumba. He obtained a degree in Psychology from Sree Narayana College, Chempazhanthy.

He married Jisha on 12 July 2001. They have a daughter named Jameema.

Awards
 1993 Kerala State television Award for Best Actor for a telefilm Lambo in Doordarshan.
He also got Premnazir Award in March 2019

Filmography

Television
Lambo (Doordarshan)
Ente Manasaputhri (Asianet)
Scooter (Doordarshan)
Comedy Ulsavam (Flowers TV)
O Henry Stories (Doordarshan Malayalam)
Mechilpurangal (Doordarshan)

References

External links 

Premkumar at MSI

1967 births
Living people
Male actors from Thiruvananthapuram
Male actors in Malayalam cinema
Indian male film actors
20th-century Indian male actors
21st-century Indian male actors